I, Tyrant is an accessory for the 2nd edition of the Advanced Dungeons & Dragons fantasy role-playing game.

Contents
I, Tyrant expands on the information given about beholders primarily in the Monstrous Manual through details of the race's history, religion, culture, settlements and psychology, as well as statistics on further true beholder deviants. The book also provides rules for psionics and magic items available to beholders.

Publication history
I, Tyrant was published by TSR in 1996 as a 93-page book.  It was designed by Aaron Allston, and featured cover illustrations by Dana Knutson, and interior illustrations by Arnie Swekel, David Martin, Glen Michael Angus, William O'Connor, and Randy Post.

I, Tyrant and the module Eye of Pain mark the first volumes in TSR's "Monstrous Arcana" series, which focuses on the most popular monsters in the AD&D game.

Reception
David Comford reviewed I, Tyrant  for Arcane magazine, rating it an 8 out of 10 overall. He comments: "As if these multi-eyed nightmares weren't deadly enough, now they can have magical items and psionics too." He notes that through I, Tyrant, "the amazing versatility of the race is depicted in great detail, raising them from merely a collection of interesting monsters to a curious and powerful civilisation. The results give referees a myriad of encounter opportunities and possibilities for inserting beholder NPCs into existing campaigns for that extra punch of spice." Comford concludes his review by stating: "The Monstrous Manual will still suffice for brief encounters with these creatures, but through expanded details on the creatures' behavior, powers, driving forces and tips on how to defeat them, I, Tyrant is useful to referees or players planning to embark upon a beholder-heavy adventure."

References

Dungeons & Dragons sourcebooks
Role-playing game supplements introduced in 1996